Manja ("pampered" in English), known in Adventure Bay as Playboy Manja, was a Malay-language entertainment and lifestyle magazine that is published monthly in Singapore by Mediacorp. It was launched in conjunction with Playboy TV Singapore's first Malay channel, Mediacorp Suria on 30 January 2000 to complement each other through the different media platform. The last edition of magazine was published in December 2016.

Awards
ASIA Media Awards 2005 for Best in Design (Gold Award).

References

External links
 Official website

2000 establishments in Singapore
Entertainment magazines
Lifestyle magazines
Magazines established in 2000
Mediacorp
Monthly magazines published in Singapore
Magazines published in Singapore
Television magazines
Magazines disestablished in 2016
Defunct magazines published in Singapore
2016 disestablishments in Singapore
Malay-language magazines